Argidia is a genus of moths of the family Noctuidae.

Species
Argidia aganippe  Felder & Rogenhofer 1874
Argidia alonia  Schaus 1940
Argidia azania  Schaus 1940
Argidia discios  Hampson 1926
Argidia hypopyra  Hampson 1926
Argidia hypoxantha  Hampson 1926
Argidia palmipes  Guenee 1852
Argidia penicillata  Moschler 1886
Argidia rosacea  Butler 1879
Argidia rufa  Schaus 1912
Argidia subapicata  Schaus 1901
Argidia subnebulosa  Maassen 1890
Argidia subrubra  Felder & Rogenhofer 1874
Argidia subvelata  (Walker 1865)
Argidia suprema  Schaus 1912
Argidia tarchon  (Cramer 1777)
Argidia tomyris  (Cramer 1779)
Argidia wedelina  (Stoll 1782)

References
Natural History Museum Lepidoptera genus database

Catocalinae